Crepidomenus is a genus of beetles in the click beetle family.

Species

 Crepidomenus adamsi Calder, 1986 
 Crepidomenus aenescens Schwarz, 1907 
 Crepidomenus aeneus Candèze, 1878 
 Crepidomenus alpestris Calder, 1986 
 Crepidomenus aurora Calder, 1986 
 Crepidomenus australis (Boisduval, 1835) 
 Crepidomenus bodalla Calder, 1986 
 Crepidomenus booralus Calder, 1986 
 Crepidomenus carri Calder, 1986 
 Crepidomenus cervus Carter, 1939 
 Crepidomenus coonabriensis Calder, 1986 
 Crepidomenus cordifer Candèze, 1878 
 Crepidomenus cyanescens Candèze, 1897 
 Crepidomenus decoratus Erichson, 1842 
 Crepidomenus dooliba Calder, 1986 
 Crepidomenus dusha Calder, 1986 
 Crepidomenus dysmikos Calder, 1986 
 Crepidomenus frazieri Calder, 1986 
 Crepidomenus fulgidus Erichson, 1842 
 Crepidomenus fuscogalbus Calder, 1986 
 Crepidomenus georgei Candèze, 1878 
 Crepidomenus gidju Calder, 1986 
 Crepidomenus gurburra Calder, 1986 
 Crepidomenus habrotatos Calder, 1986 
 Crepidomenus illinitus Schwarz, 1902 
 Crepidomenus kateewailwo Calder, 1986 
 Crepidomenus kohouti Calder, 1986 
 Crepidomenus kokereka Calder, 1986 
 Crepidomenus konkinyeri Calder, 1986 
 Crepidomenus kurrajongensis Calder, 1986 
 Crepidomenus lansbergei Candèze, 1889 
 Crepidomenus luteipes Boheman, 1858 
 Crepidomenus marginatus Schwarz, 1907 
 Crepidomenus meannjini Calder, 1986 
 Crepidomenus memnonius Calder, 1986 
 Crepidomenus metallescens Candèze, 1863 
 Crepidomenus montanus Carter, 1939 
 Crepidomenus neboissi Calder, 1986 
 Crepidomenus occidualis Calder, 1986 
 Crepidomenus ovalis Candèze, 1887 
 Crepidomenus patulus Calder, 1986 
 Crepidomenus piceus Calder, 1986 
 Crepidomenus prolinwittha Calder, 1986 
 Crepidomenus psephenos Calder, 1986 
 Crepidomenus purkabidnis Calder, 1986 
 Crepidomenus quadraticollis Schwarz, 1903 
 Crepidomenus seniculus Candèze;ze, 1863 
 Crepidomenus subopacus Candèze, 1878 
 Crepidomenus taeniatus Erichson, 1842 
 Crepidomenus tamellescens Calder, 1986 
 Crepidomenus tandarnya Calder, 1986 
 Crepidomenus tokorauwe Calder, 1986 
 Crepidomenus trawalla Calder, 1986 
 Crepidomenus tuckurimbah Calder, 1986 
 Crepidomenus tyrilly Calder, 1986 
 Crepidomenus victoriae Candèze, 1863 
 Crepidomenus vitticollis Schwarz, 1902 
 Crepidomenus vulneratus Candèze, 1897 
 Crepidomenus warkolala Calder, 1986 
 Crepidomenus wollumbina Calder, 1986 
 Crepidomenus yuggus Calder, 1986

References 

Elateridae genera